Karachi Port Trust Football Club is a Pakistani football club based in Kharadar, Karachi. The club is affiliated with Karachi Port Trust and play their home matches at KPT Stadium in Kharadar. They are nicknamed "The Portmen" and referred to as "The Arsenal of Karachi" for their short passing games.

The club is one of the founding member of current top-flight league Pakistan Premier League, appearing in every season since the first edition in 2004, until their relegation in the current season.

KPT won the Challenge Cup in 1990. KPT FC and Karachi United became the most popular football clubs from Karachi.

Rivalry 
Karachi Port Trust F.C. has a rivalry with Gwadar Port Authority. Karachi Port Trust defeated Gwadar Port Authority 4-1 in their group stage match which ruled them out of the 2012 National Challenge Cup. Their matches are known as the "Port Derby".

Achievements
Pakistan National Football Challenge Cup
Winners (1): 1990
Runner-up (4): 1987, 1991, 1998, 2003
Aga Khan Gold Cup
Winners (1): 1964 (shared)

References

Football clubs in Pakistan
Works association football clubs in Pakistan
Football in Karachi
Association football clubs established in 1887
1887 establishments in India